Gym Teacher: The Movie is a 2008 American-Canadian sports comedy film produced by Pacific Bay Entertainment. It stars Christopher Meloni, Nathan Kress, Amy Sedaris, David Alan Grier and Chelah Horsdal. It premiered on September 12, 2008.

Plot
David "Dave" Stewie (Christopher Meloni) is a middle school PE teacher who sees a forthcoming award as a way to redeem himself of his greatest regret, a failure to make the 1988 US Olympic Team. Meanwhile, Roland Waffle (Nathan Kress) is a new transfer student who is completely non-athletic and wears a helmet at all times due to his mother worrying he will get hurt. Abigail "Abby" Hoffman (Amy Sedaris) is the principal who carries "a Filipino fighting stick" to assault night prowlers lurking after school, and Morgan (Brenna O'Brien), Champ (Avan Jogia) and Derrick (Jordan Becker), who are students of the school.

Cast
Christopher Meloni as Coach David "Dave" Stewie
Nathan Kress as Roland Waffle
Amy Sedaris as Principal  Abigail "Abby" Hoffman
David Alan Grier as Coach Shelly Bragg
Chelah Horsdal as Winnie Bleeker
Brenna O'Brien as Morgan
Avan Jogia as Champ Townsend
Jordan Becker as Derrick
Alexia Fast as Susie Salisbury
Ellie Harvie as Ms. Shoenbourg
Caitlyn Jenner (Credited as Bruce Jenner) as Bruce Jenner
Chris Kattan as ESPN Announcer / Sploopers Show Host

Production
Film was produced by Pacific Bay Entertainment and was shot in Vancouver, British Columbia; all school scenes were filmed at Templeton Secondary School.

DVD release
The DVD of the film was released on February 3, 2009 by Sony Pictures Home Entertainment.

References

External links

2008 television films
2008 films
2000s teen comedy films
American children's comedy films
Canadian children's comedy films
American teen comedy films
Canadian teen comedy films
English-language Canadian films
Films about educators
Films directed by Paul Dinello
Films scored by Daniel Licht
Films shot in Vancouver
Nickelodeon original films
2000s English-language films
2000s American films
2000s Canadian films